A Soul Experiment is a studio album by American jazz trumpeter Freddie Hubbard recorded between 1968/1969 and released in 1969. It was his third release on the Atlantic label and features performances by Hubbard, Carlos Garnett, Kenny Barron, Gary Illingworth, Billy Butler, Eric Gale, Jerry Jemmott, and Grady Tate.

Reception
Al Campbell of AllMusic gave the album three stars out of five, stating "This disc pairs separate Atlantic reissues from two of the finest hard bop brass players of all time, Nat Adderley and Freddie Hubbard. A Soul Experiment finds Hubbard grasping for 1969 commercial radio acceptance with shorter songs, and a stab at Jimmy Webb's "Wichita Lineman." A Soul Experiment isn't horrible, but in no way does it represent the artistry of Freddie Hubbard."

Track listing
All compositions by Freddie Hubbard except as indicated

 "Clap Your Hands" (Don Pickett) – 3:26
 "Wichita Lineman" (Jimmy Webb) – 3:17
 "South Street Stroll" (Barron) – 4:28
 "Lonely Soul" – 3:03
 "No Time to Lose" (Garnett) – 4:32
 "Hang 'Em Up" (Garnett) – 3:08
 "Good Humor Man" (Pickett) – 3:43
 "Midnite Soul" – 5:19
 "Soul Turn Around" (Walter Bishop, Jr.) – 4:01
 "A Soul Experiment" – 3:55

Personnel
Freddie Hubbard – trumpet
Carlos Garnett – tenor saxophone (#3-9)
Kenny Barron – piano
Gary Illingworth – organ
Billy Butler – guitar (#3, 7, 9)
Eric Gale – guitar (# 1–2, 4–6, 8, 10)
Jerry Jemmott – bass
Grady Tate – drums (#3, 7, 9)
Bernard Purdie - drums (#1, 2, 5)

References

1969 albums
Freddie Hubbard albums
Albums produced by Joel Dorn
Atlantic Records albums